Veronica persica is a flowering plant in the family Plantaginaceae. Common names include birdeye speedwell, common field-speedwell, Persian speedwell, large field speedwell, bird's-eye, or winter speedwell. It is native to Eurasia and is widespread as an introduced species in the British Isles (where it was first recorded in 1825), North America, eastern Asia, including Japan and China, and Australia and New Zealand.

Description
Veronica persica is an annual that reproduces from seed.

Its cotyledons are triangular with truncated bases. The leaves are paired on the lower stem and are alternately arranged on the upper parts. The plant has weak stems that form a dense, prostrate groundcover. The tips of stems often grow upright.

They are zygomorphic, having only one vertical plane of symmetry. They are solitary on long, slender, hairy stalks in the leaf axils.

There are five to 10 seeds per locule in the fruit.

Veronica persica can be distinguished from similar species by its heart-shaped fruit with two widely-separated lobes.

Habitat
The plant grows in fields and lawns. It prefers moist conditions and grows well in loamy soil.

Horticultural uses
Although many species in the genus are used in gardens (such as V. exalta, V. incana, V. gentianoides, V. longifolia, V. perfoliata, and V. spicata), this species is generally seen as a weed and has no known horticultural uses.

Herbal medicine
Afghani herbalist, Mahomet Allum, used the plant to treat patients with heart trouble, in Adelaide, Australia, in the mid-20th century.
It is also used for snakebite treatment, hemorrhaging, rheumatoid arthritis, asthma, and as an expectorant.

References

persica
Plants described in 1808